Dzhanka ("damson") is a village in Krumovgrad municipality, Kardzhali Province in the very south of Bulgaria, located in the Eastern Rhodopes. The majority of its population consists of ethnic Turks. 

 the village's population is 750 and the mayor is Hamdi Hasan.

References

Villages in Kardzhali Province